Sirch Rural District is a rural district (dehestan) in Shahdad District, Kerman County, Kerman Province, Iran. At the 2006 census, its population was 2,600, in 676 families. The rural district has 14 villages.

References 

Rural Districts of Kerman Province
Kerman County